Plutón was a  of the Spanish Navy that fought at the Battle of Santiago de Cuba during the Spanish–American War.

Technical characteristics
Plutón was built in the United Kingdom. Her keel was laid by Thomson on 12 February 1897; the company changed its name to Clydebank Engineering & Shipbuilding Co. in April 1897 and completed her under this name on 4 November 1897. She had three funnels. In the parlance of the day, she was a "torpedo boat destroyer", designed to protect larger ships against torpedo boat attack, but also carrying torpedoes with which to attack larger ships herself.

Operational history

As tensions between Spain and the United States grew in early 1898, Plutón was part of the Spanish Navy's 1st Squadron, commanded by Vice Admiral Pascual Cervera y Topete. The squadron was ordered to concentrate at São Vicente in Portugal's Cape Verde Islands. The ships had experienced mechanical problems and burned an excessive amount of coal during the voyage.

The Spanish–American War began while Plutón was at São Vicente. Ordered by neutral Portugal in accordance with international law to leave São Vicente within 24 hours of the declaration of war, Plutón and the rest of Cervera's squadron departed on 29 April 1898, bound for San Juan, Puerto Rico. Because of continuing engine trouble and low coal supplies, Plutón and her fellow destroyers were towed part of the way. Cervera's ships reached French-owned Martinique in the Lesser Antilles on 10 May 1898.  While Plutón and the armored cruisers loitered in international waters, Furor and Terror went into Fort-de-France to ask for coal. France was neutral and would not supply coal, so the Spanish squadron—minus Terror, which stayed behind at Fort-de-France with engine trouble—departed on 12 May 1898 for Dutch-owned Curaçao, where Cervera expected to meet a collier.  Cervera arrived at Willemstad on 14 May, but the Netherlands also was neutral, and strictly enforced its neutrality by allowing only Vizcaya and Infanta Maria Teresa to enter port and permitting them to load only 600 tons of coal. On 15 May, Cervera's ships departed, no longer bound for San Juan, which by now was under a U.S. Navy blockade, but for as-yet unblockaded Santiago de Cuba on the southeastern coast of Cuba, arriving there on 19 May 1898.  Cervera hoped to refit his ships there before he could be trapped. His squadron was still in the harbor of Santiago de Cuba when an American squadron arrived on 27 May 1898 and began a blockade which would drag on for 37 days.

Some action occurred during the blockade. On 3 June 1898, the U.S. Navy steamed the collier  into the entrance channel to the harbor, hoping to scuttle her so as to block the channel and trap the Spanish ships inside. Spanish shore batteries already had disabled Merrimac when she drifted up the channel to a point where the Spanish ships could fire on her as well.  Plutón, Vizacaya, and unprotected cruiser  all opened fire, and Merrimac quickly sank in a position that did not block the entrance. Apparently a torpedo from Plutón gave the coup de grâce to Merrimac.

The blockade wore on, with Plutón and the others enduring occasional American naval bombardments of the harbor. Some of her men joined others from the fleet in a Naval Brigade to fight against a U.S. Army overland drive toward Santiago de Cuba.

By the beginning of July 1898, that drive threatened to capture Santiago de Cuba, and Cervera decided that his squadron's only hope was to try to escape into the open sea by running the blockade. The decision was made on 1 July 1898, with the break-out set for 3 July 1898. The crew of Plutón spent 2 July 1898 returning from Naval Brigade service and preparing for action. Plutón was to be the sixth and last ship in line during the escape, following the four armored cruisers and Furor; while Infanta María Teresa sacrificed herself by attacking the fastest American ship, the armored cruiser , Plutón and the others were to avoid action, put on all the speed they could, and run for the open sea.

At about 0845 hours on 3 July 1898, the Spanish ships got underway. The U.S. squadron sighted the Spanish ships in the channel at about 0935, and the Battle of Santiago de Cuba began.

While the four armored cruisers turned to starboard to run westward, Plutón and Furor turned inside them and made their run closer to the coast. The blockading American battleships and armored cruisers opened fire on the two destroyers as they emerged from the channel, hitting both destroyers several times, but then turned their attention to pursuing the Spanish cruisers. The two damaged destroyers put on speed, pursued only by the armed yacht , a ship less well armed than the destroyers, but larger, faster, and undamaged. Gloucester hit both destroyers repeatedly. Too badly damaged to continue, Plutón ran herself aground at 1045 on the beach just west of Cabanas Bay, a total loss. Those of her crew who got ashore had to beware of Cuban insurgents, who began shooting Spanish sailors they found along the shore. Other survivors were taken off by U.S. sailors who brought small boats alongside her wreck.

Notes

References
 Chesneau, Roger, and Eugene M. Kolesnik, Eds. Conway's All The World's Fighting Ships 1860–1905. New York, New York: Mayflower Books Inc., 1979. .
 Nofi, Albert A. The Spanish–American War, 1898. Conshohocken, Pennsylvania: Combined Books, Inc., 1996. .

External links
 The Spanish–American War Centennial Website: Torpedo-Boat Destroyers Furor, Plutón, and Terror
 Department of the Navy: Naval Historical Center: Online Library of Selected Images: Spanish Navy Ships: Plutón (Destroyer, 1897–1898)

Furor-class destroyers
Ships built on the River Clyde
1897 ships
Spanish–American War destroyers of Spain
Shipwrecks in the Caribbean Sea
Shipwrecks of the Spanish–American War